An abandoned (or disused) railway station is a building or structure which was constructed to serve as a railway station but has fallen into disuse. There are various circumstances when this may occur – a railway company may fall bankrupt, or the station may be closed due to the failure of economic activity such as insufficient passenger numbers, operational reasons such as the diversion or replacement of the line. In some instances, the railway line may continue in operation while the station is closed. Additionally, stations may sometimes be resited along the route of the line to new premises – examples of this include opening a replacement station nearer to the centre of population, or building a larger station on a less restricted site to cope with high passenger numbers.

Reasons for abandonment
Notable cases where railway stations have fallen into disuse include the Beeching Axe, a 1960s programme of mass closures of unprofitable railway lines by the British Government. The London Underground system is also noted for its list of closed stations. During the time of the Berlin Wall, a number of Berlin U-Bahn stations on West Berlin lines became "ghost stations" (Geisterbahnhöfe) because they were on lines which passed through East Berlin territory.

Dereliction and alternative uses

Railway stations and lines which fall into disuse may become overgrown. 

Some former railway lines are repurposed as managed nature reserves, trails or other tourist attractions – for example Hellfire Pass, the route of the former "Death Railway" in Thailand. Many former railways are converted into long-distance cycleways, such as large sections of the National Cycle Network in the United Kingdom. 

In rural areas, former railway station buildings are often converted into private residences. Examples include many of the stations on the closed Didcot, Newbury and Southampton Railway in England. Architecturally and historically notable station buildings may present a problem if they are protected under building preservation laws but fall into disuse. Such buildings are often simply demolished (such as Broad Street railway station (London)), or they may be preserved as part of a heritage railway. 

Often, in order to be retained as commercially viable structures within an urban environment, or as part of an urban regeneration project, they may be repurposed for alternative activities. Prominent examples include the ornate Gare d'Orsay in Paris, which was converted into the Musée d'Orsay art gallery; the Manchester Central railway station, which was put to new use first as a car park and later refurbished as the Manchester Central Conference Centre; and Broad Street Station in Richmond, Virginia, which now houses the Science Museum of Virginia. The Ottawa Convention Centre is a former station, as are railway museums Memory Junction in Brighton and Railway Museum of Eastern Ontario in Smiths Falls. In Prescott the rail station houses historical society offices; in Lac-Mégantic and Kingston a former station houses a tourism information office. Stations have also been transformed into restaurants or private residences.

Restoration
Many abandoned railway stations and line are now being brought back into operational service, notably in the UK where environmental policy is driving the reversal of some of the Beeching closures of the 1960s. In London the Docklands Light Railway made use of disused railway infrastructure for much of its construction; in Manchester it is proposed to expand the Metrolink light rail system by re-opening abandoned rail lines; and in Scotland, the Scottish Government has brought the Waverley Line partially back into passenger service.

Cultural significance
Some railfans have a particular fascination with abandoned railway stations, lines, and tunnels. In some cases – particularly with underground structures – these were never actually abandoned. Rather they were constructed to allow for future expansion, but never actually used. The underground aspect is often of particular interest, and extends beyond railbuffs to urban speleologists.

The mass closure of stations during the 1960s can evoke a nostalgic response in British culture, as expressed in the elegiac song "Slow Train" written by Flanders and Swann, which lists a number of railway stations across Britain and laments their demise.

Gallery

See also 

 Abandoned railway
 Ghost station
 List of closed railway stations in Britain
 List of former and unopened London Underground stations
 List of closed railway stations in Melbourne
 List of closed New York City Subway stations
 Disused railway tunnels in Sydney

References

External links

UK
 Subterranea Britannica: Disused Stations
 Abandoned Stations in East Anglia

London Underground
 London Railways: Ghost Underground Stations
 Underground History
 London's Abandoned Tube Stations
 BBC h2g2: Ghost Underground Stations

New York City Subway
 Abandoned New York City Subway Stations